is a city located in the northern part of Niigata Prefecture. It is the capital and the most populous city of Niigata Prefecture, and one of the cities designated by government ordinance of Japan, located in the Chūbu region of Japan. It is the most populous city on the west coast of Honshu, and the second populous city in Chūbu region after Nagoya. It faces the Sea of Japan and Sado Island. , the city had an estimated population of 779,049, and a population density of 1,072 persons per km2. Greater Niigata, the Niigata Metropolitan Employment Area, has a GDP of US$43.3 billion as of 2010.

It is the only government-designated city on the west coast of Honshu. It has the greatest habitable area of cities in Japan. It is designated as a reform base for the large scale agriculture under  initiatives.

Overview
Niigata was one of the cities incorporated by the legislation effective on April 1, 1889 (Meiji 22). With a long history as a port town, Niigata served the function of the network junction between the maritime traffic and those of Shinano and Agano river systems. It was designated as one of the five free Treaty ports under Treaty of Amity and Commerce (United States-Japan) signed in 1858, just before the Meiji Restoration, later started operations in 1869. Its importance in land and water transportation is still current. 

Niigata's city government was established in 1889. Mergers with nearby municipalities in 2005 allowed the city's population to jump to 810,000. The annexation of the surrounding area has also given the city the greatest rice paddy field acreage in Japan. On April 1, 2007, it became the first government-designated city on the coast of the Sea of Japan of Honshu. There are 8 wards (described later) in the city.

Until 1950’s, a system of canals were lined along by the willow trees in the downtown area of Niigata.  Therefore the city is sometimes called the “City of Water” or “City of Willows” as detailed later. Niigata produced many manga artists (see: Artists and writers). It is also known to have an extensive network of bypass roads. Bandai bridge, NEXT21, Toki Messe, Denka Big Swan Stadium, Niigata Nippo Media Ship are considered to be the key symbol landmarks in the city (see: Local attractions).

Toponymy
The place name "Niigata" was first recorded in 1520 (Eisho 17). Its name in kanji can be translated as  "new” and  "lagoon".

However, as there is no record about the origin of the name, this had led to many theories. 
First "Niigata" was a large lagoon at the mouth of the Shinano river. 
Second it was an inland bay at the river's entrance. 
Third it was the name of a village that stood on an island within the estuary. 
Fourth it referred to another settlement that relocated to the Furumachi district and that in turn gave its name to a nearby lagoon.

Cityscapes

Geography

Niigata is situated on a fertile coastal plain on the Sea of Japan coast, facing Sado Island. The Shinano River and Agano River flow through the city.

Numerous wetlands, such as the Fukushimagata wetlands, can be found within the city limits. The Sakata lagoon is registered as a wetland of international importance under the Ramsar Convention.

Niigata City's low elevation and abundant water have made flood control and land reclamation important issues for the area throughout its history.

The city is sometimes called the  because of the two rivers that flow through it, its position next to the Sea of Japan, its many wetlands, and the canals that used to run through the city.

Climate
Niigata City features a humid subtropical climate (Cfa), but receives more yearly snowfall than cities such as Moscow, Montreal or Oslo. The climate in Niigata City is characterized by its high humidity and strong winds from the Sea of Japan in winter. While many other parts of Niigata Prefecture tend to have heavy snow, Niigata City itself usually receives less due to its low-lying elevation and the shielding effect of Sado Island.

However, Niigata City does receive much precipitation, mostly in the form of rainfall. On average, Niigata City has 269 days of precipitation each year, about 170 days of which see rain or snowfall measuring over 1 mm. The rainy season in July brings large amounts of rain, while the winter months, especially November and December, also have much precipitation.

In summer, the south wind makes the weather rather hot. Typhoons usually bring strong foehn winds to this area, generally causing somewhat higher temperatures than in other parts of Japan. The weather on the west coast of Honshu tends to be better during the summer months than on the Pacific coast.

Wards

Niigata has a system of wards (ku) since April 1, 2007: Each ward has its own "image color".

Adjoining communities
From the north, following Niigata's border clockwise:

 Seirō, Kitakanbara District
 Shibata
 Agano
 Gosen
 Tagami, Minamikanbara District
 Kamo
 Sanjō
 Tsubame
 Yahiko, Nishikanbara District
 Nagaoka

 In addition Sado Island is connected by sea and air routes.

History

Prehistoric and ancient
People have inhabited the Niigata area (Furutsu Hachimanyama Site) since the Jōmon period, though much of the current land was still beneath the sea at the time. According to the Nihon Shoki, a fortress was built in the area in AD 647.

Middle Ages
Feudal period
In the 16th century, a port called Niigata was established at the mouth of the Shinano River, while a port town with the name Nuttari developed at the mouth of the Agano River. The area prospered beneath the rule of Uesugi Kenshin during the Sengoku Period.

Early Modern Ages
A system of canals was constructed throughout the downtown area of Niigata port in the 17th century. During this period, the courses of the Shinano and Agano rivers gradually changed until they poured into the Sea of Japan at the same location. As a result, Niigata prospered as a port town, serving as a port of call for Japanese trade ships traversing the Sea of Japan.

The Matsugasaki Canal was constructed in 1730 to drain the Agano River area, but in 1731, flooding destroyed the canal and caused it to become the main current of the Agano River. As a result, the volume of water flowing into the port of Niigata decreased, which in turn allowed land reclamation efforts and the development of new rice fields to proceed.

Late Modern Ages
In 1858, Niigata was designated as one of the five ports to be opened for international trade in the Japan–U.S. Treaty of Amity and Commerce. However, the shallow water level in the port delayed the actual opening to foreign ships until 1869. The port also served as a valuable base for fishermen who roamed as far north as the Kamchatka Peninsula to catch salmon and other fish.

In 1886, the first Bandai Bridge was built across the Shinano River to connect the settlements of Niigata on the west and Nuttari on the east. Niigata annexed Nuttari in 1914.

During World War II, Niigata's strategic location between the capital of Tokyo and the Sea of Japan made it a key point for the transfer of settlers and military personnel to the Asian continent, including Manchukuo.

Contemporary Ages
In 1945, near the end of the war, Niigata was one of four cities, together with Hiroshima, Kokura, and Nagasaki, picked as targets for the atomic bombs if Japan did not surrender. However, Niigata was not actually targeted in the first two missions. There were several theories about the reasons that Niigata was lowered in the priority, such as  poor weather conditions, its distance from B-29 bases in the Mariana Islands, and other factors. 

On August 11, 1945, after the second atomic bombing in Nagasaki, the governor of Niigata Prefecture ordered the people to evacuate as concerns of an impending bombing heightened, and the city was completely deserted for days until the war ended without more atomic bombings. 

A devastating Typhoon Louise and fire in 1955 destroyed much of the downtown area, but eventually the city recovered. In 1958, construction of the relocated Niigata Station was completed, extending the downtown area from Bandai Bridge. The Niigata Thermal Power Station Unit 1 started operation in July 1963. At that time, it was Japan's first power plant capable of using a mixture of natural gas and heavy oil.

In 1964, the old canals that flowed throughout the old downtown area were filled in to make way for more roads.

On June 16, 1964, at 13:01 Japan Standard Time an earthquake of 7.5 Richter scale struck the city, killing 29 people and causing large-scale property damage, with 1,960 totally destroyed buildings, 6,640 partially destroyed buildings, and 15,298 severely inundated by liquefaction.

In 1965, the Agano River running through Niigata was polluted with methylmercury from the chemical plant of the Showa Electrical Company. Over 690 people exhibited symptoms of Minamata disease and the outbreak became known as Niigata Minamata disease.

In 1982, Shinkansen service on the Jōetsu Shinkansen line began between Niigata and Omiya, with service to Ueno added in 1985. The line was extended to Tokyo in 1991.

Big Swan Stadium in Niigata City hosted three games during the 2002 FIFA World Cup.

The 2004 Chūetsu earthquake did not cause any significant damage in Niigata City itself, allowing the city to work as a relief base.

The size and the population of Niigata city increased over the four-year period between 2001 and 2005, due to a series of municipal mergers. On April 1, 2007, Niigata City became first city on the west coast of Honshu to become a government-designated city.

In July 2007, the Chūetsu offshore earthquake, measuring 6.9 on Richter scale, rocked Niigata Prefecture. Though the earthquake was felt in the city, there was little damage, which allowed Niigata City to provide aid to the devastated areas.

In May 2008, the city hosted the 2008 G8 Labor Ministers Meeting.

On March 12, 2011, several hours after the massive 9.0 Tohoku earthquake struck off the east coast of Honshu, Niigata and Nagano Prefectures experienced an estimated magnitude 6.6 earthquake.

Mergers

On April 1, 1889 - the village of Sekiya was amalgamated into the town of Niigata to become the city of Niigata.
On April 1, 1914 - The town of Nuttari (from Nakakanbara District) was amalgamated into the city of Niigata.
On June 1, 1943 - The village of Ohgata (from Nakakanbara District) was amalgamated into the city of Niigata.
On December 8, 1943 - The villages of Ishiyama and Toyano (both from Nakakanbara District) were amalgamated into the city of Niigata.
On April 5, 1954 - The village of Matsugasakihama (from Kitakanbara District) was amalgamated into the city of Niigata.
On November 1, 1954 - The villages of Nigorikawa and Minamihama (both from Kitakanbara District) and the village of Sakaiwa (from Nishikanbara District) were amalgamated into the city of Niigata.
On May 3, 1957 - The villages of Ryokawa, Sonoki and Oheyama (all from Nakakanbara District) were amalgamated into the city of Niigata.
On January 11, 1960 - The town of Uchino (from Nishikanbara District) was merged into the city of Niigata.
On April 1, 1960 - The Hamaura hamlet of the town of Toyosaka (from Kitakanbara District) was merged into the city of Niigata.
On June 1, 1961 - The villages of Nakanokoya and Akatsuka (both from Nishikanbara District) were amalgamated into the city of Niigata.
On January 1, 2001 - The town of Kurosaki (from Nishikanbara District) was amalgamated into the city of Niigata.
On March 21, 2005 - The cities of Niitsu, Shirone and Toyosaka, the towns of Kameda, Kosudo and Yokogoshi (all from Nakakanbara District), the town of Nishikawa, and the villages of Ajikata, Iwamuro, Katahigashi, Nakanokuchi and Tsukigata (all from Nishikanbara District) were all merged into the expanded city of Niigata.
On October 10, 2005 - The town of Maki (from Nishikanbara District) was merged into the expanded city of Niigata.

Government

City Hall
List of mayors of Niigata City (1889 to present)

External relations

Twin towns – sister cities

International
Sister Cities
Niigata maintains sister city ties with six cities:

Friendship cities

Partnership cities
In addition, special exchange agreements have been set up with the following:
 Kingston upon Hull, United Kingdom
 Ulsan, South Korea (since September 2007)

National
Partnership cities

Education

Colleges and universities
Niigata University
University of Niigata Prefecture
Niigata Seiryo University
The Nippon Dental University School of Life Dentistry at Niigata
Niigata University of Pharmacy and Applied Life Sciences
International University of Japan
Niigata University of International and Information Studies
Niigata University of Health and Welfare
Graduate Institute for Entrepreneurial Studies
College of Biomedical Technology Niigata University

Transportation

Airways

Airport
Niigata Airport is located about 6 km north of central Niigata. It handles some international destinations as well as many domestic ones. As of October 2016, the domestic destinations available are Osaka (10 times a day), Sapporo (five or six times a day), Fukuoka (three times a day), Okinawa (once or twice a day), Nagoya (three times a day), Narita (once a day) and Sado Island (three times a day).

Niigata Airport's international destinations are Harbin (twice a week), Seoul (five times a week), Shanghai (twice a week) and Vladivostok.

Railways
The largest station in Niigata City is Niigata Station. It is centrally located in the Bandai area, one of the two main shopping districts in downtown Niigata. Approximately 37,000 passengers use the station daily. The Jōetsu Shinkansen, which terminates at Niigata Station, provides daily service to Tokyo. The Shin'etsu Main Line, Hakushin Line, Echigo Line, Uetsu Main Line, and Ban'etsu West Line also terminate at Niigata Station. These lines serve Myoko, Itoigawa, Akita, Sakata, and Aizuwakamatsu.

Niigata Kotsu Dentetsu Line and Kambara Dentetsu trains used to run through the city until the late 1990s; however, they no longer exist.

High-Speed Rail
East Japan Railway Company（JR East）
Jōetsu Shinkansen：-

Conventional lines
East Japan Railway Company（JR East）
Shin'etsu Main Line：-   -  -  -  -  -  -   - 
Hakushin Line： -  -  -  -  -  - 
Echigo Line：  -  -  -   -  -  -  -  -  -  -  -  -  -

Buses

Transit Bus
BRT "Bandai-bashi Line" runs through business/shopping districts in the central Niigata (Niigata Station - Bandai Bridge - Furumachi - City hall - Hakusan Station - Aoyama).

Roads

Expressways
Nihonkai-Tōhoku Expressway
Hokuriku Expressway
Ban-etsu Expressway

Japan National Route

Seaways

Sea port
The Port of Niigata served as a part of kitamaebune during Edo era, and became one of the five open ports according to the Treaty of Amity and Commerce (United States–Japan) in 1858. The west district of the port of Niigata provides passenger transportation facilities as well as cargo transportation, while the east district is dedicated for cargo capabilities, including the container terminal facilities.

The destinations of the passenger services available at the port of Niigata include Ryotsu on Sado island, Otaru, Akita, Tsuruga.

Until 2006, Niigata was formerly the terminus of the Mangyongbong-92 ferry, one of the direct connections between Japan and North Korea.

Local attractions

 Furumachi, Bandai City - Downtown shopping districts
 Toki Messe, Next21, Niigata Nippo Media Ship,  - skyscrapers with observation decks
 
 
 Niigata City History Museum (Minatopia)
 Northern Culture Museum
 
 
 
 Niigata Prefectural Botanical Garden
 Nature Aquarium Gallery

Culture

Niigata has its own geisha culture since over 200 years ago dating back to the Edo period. This was due to the prosperity of the city as a port town. Locally they are called geigi and the tradition continues on. Most ochaya are located in the Furumachi neighbourhood with well-known places such as the Nabechaya.

Events
  (every August)
 
 Niigata Comic Market
 Niigata Manga Competition
 Kurosaki Festival

Foods
 Tare Katsudon
 Noppe
 Kakinomoto

Sports

Notable people from Niigata

Artists and writers
Yaichi Aizu, poet, calligrapher, and historian
. manga artist
Shu Fujisawa, writer
Makoto Kobayashi, manga artist
Mineo Maya, manga artist
Shinji Mizushima, manga artist
Tadashi Nakayama, contemporary woodblock artist
Takeshi Obata, manga artist
One, manga artist
Ango Sakaguchi, author
Rumiko Takahashi, manga artist

Actors and voice actors
Fumika Baba, actress
Mina Fujii, actress
Toshihito Ito, actor
Masashi Mikami, actor
Bin Shimada, voice actor
Keiko Yokozawa, voice actor

Musicians
coba, accordionist and composer
Double, singer
Yoko Ishida, singer
Kazuya Kato, bassist
Katsutaro Kouta, singer
Közi, guitarist (Malice Mizer and Eve of Destiny)
NGT48, idol group
Rina Sawayama, singer-songwriter and model
Akira Yamaoka, composer
 samfree, vocaloid music composer

Others
Takashi Amano, professional aquarist and track cyclist
Kunio Maekawa, architect
SANADA (Seiya Sanada), professional wrestler
Tadao Sato, film critic and film theorist
Megumi Sato, high jumper
Meiko Satomura, professional wrestler
Yujiro Takahashi, professional wrestler
Megumi Yokota, abduction victim
Yutakayama Ryota, sumo wrestler

References

Notes

External links

Official Website 

 
Cities in Niigata Prefecture
Port settlements in Japan
Populated coastal places in Japan
Atomic bombings of Hiroshima and Nagasaki
Cities designated by government ordinance of Japan